Energy is a rapid transit station on the Branch Line of the Dubai Metro in Dubai, UAE, serving Jebel Ali and surrounding areas.

The station opened as part of the Red Line on 30 September 2013. It changed to Branch Line on June 1, 2021.

Energy station is located on the Sheikh Zayed Road near the major junction with the D57 road. Nearby are Festival Plaza and the Gurunanak Sikh Temple. Surrounding neighbourhoods include Jabal Ali 3 and Al Muntazah. The station is close to a number of bus routes.

References

Railway stations in the United Arab Emirates opened in 2013
Dubai Metro stations